Darvag (Dərvaq) is a rural locality (a selo) in Tabasaransky District, Republic of Dagestan, Russia. The population was 2,889 as of 2010. There are 6 streets.

Geography 
Darvag is located 18 km northeast of Khuchni (the district's administrative centre) by road. Yersi is the nearest rural locality.

References 

Rural localities in Tabasaransky District